Styles, Crews, Flows, Beats is a vinyl EP by Peanut Butter Wolf, released in 1998 on Stones Throw, and in the UK on Copasetik Records. This EP features two tracks later released on Peanut Butter Wolf's 1999 album My Vinyl Weighs a Ton, with the remaining five tracks unavailable elsewhere.

Track listing

Personnel

External links
Styles, Crews, Flows, Beats on Stones Throw
Peanut Butter Wolf on Stones Throw
Stones Throw Records

2007 albums
Stones Throw Records albums
Peanut Butter Wolf albums